Tom Criel (born 6 June 1983 in Eeklo) is a former Belgian cyclist.

Palmarès

2006
3rd Giro della Valle d'Aosta
1st Stage 5
4th De Vlaamse Pijl
2007
1st Brussels-Opwijk
2008
6th Grote Prijs Jef Scherens
2009
3rd Internationale Wielertrofee Jong Maar Moedig
2011
 East Flanders Road Race Champion

References

1983 births
Living people
Belgian male cyclists
People from Eeklo
Cyclists from East Flanders